A monkey's fist or monkey paw is a type of knot, so named because it looks somewhat like a small bunched fist or paw. It is tied at the end of a rope to serve as a weight, making it easier to throw, and also as an ornamental knot. This type of weighted rope can be used as a hand-to-hand weapon, called a slungshot by sailors. It was also used in the past as an anchor in rock climbing, by stuffing it into a crack. It is still sometimes used today in sandstone, as in the Elbe Sandstone Mountains in Germany.

Description

The monkey's fist knot is most often used as the weight in a heaving line. The line would have the monkey's fist on one end, an eye splice or bowline on the other, with about 30 feet (~10 metres) of line between. A lightweight feeder line would be tied to the bowline, then the weighted heaving line could be hurled between ship and dock. The other end of the lightweight line would be attached to a heavier-weight line, allowing it to be drawn to the target easily.

The knot is often tied around a small weight, such as a stone, marble, tight fold of paper, grapeshot, or a piece of wood. However, this may be considered unsafe and therefore poor seamanship.
The UK Maritime and Coastguard Agency's (MCA) publication "Code of Safe Working Practices for Merchant Seamen", Section 25.3.2, states that "heaving lines should be constructed with a 'monkey’s fist' at one end. To prevent personal injury, the 'fist' should be made only with rope and should not contain added weighting materials".

They should not be attached by metal or plastic clip to the heaving line. Some port authorities instruct linesmen to cut off monkey's fists that use these fastenings.

Tying

The three coils of cordage in a monkey's fist form in effect a set of Borromean rings in three dimensions. This is most obvious when tied flat. The rings should then be started near center, coiled from outside inwards, in all three set of rings, and the third set finished by letting the end exit through the triangular hole at the center. Subsequent tightening should let the outside edges curl to form an opposing triangular hole around the main part. This is suitable if a ring formed object is to be contained in the central cavity around the main part. If the object has no hole, it might be desirable to have the ends exit the knot at or near the central triangular hole.

Other applications 

A monkey's fist can be used on two ends of a tow lines of one side a fish net which is then thrown from one trawler to another, allowing the net to be cast and set between two boats so the trawl can be used between the two, in pair trawling where the tow or catch is negotiated between both parties. This makes it easier to catch fish given the greater surface area between both boats to turn around and catch missed fish from the sea much more quickly. Once all fish have been hauled up from the sea, tow lines of the fish net is returned by way of thrown both monkey's fists back to the host trawler. Alternatively, a monkey fist can be used as a weight of a heaving line thrown to over to an opposing ship to bring two ships together.

Monkey's fists are commonly used as a convenient and unobtrusive method of storing and transporting precious gemstones.

A throwing monkey's fist can be created by tying around a heavy material such as iron ball, or stone. A floating monkey's fist can be created by tying around a buoyant material such as cork, styrofoam, air filled ring or ball.

It is also the most common knot used in a pair for cufflinks where it is considered a "silk knot."

Monkey fists have become popular as main deployment handles for sport parachute systems.

Monkey fists are often used in modern begleri as they are gentler on the knuckles than metal beads.

Monkey fists are often used in shibari and bondage, tied partway down the rope to be used as a gag.

See also
 Heaving line knot
List of knots

Notes

External links

Decorative knots
Nautical terminology
Animated tying diagram